Aleksei Vladimirovich Vershinin (born 4 September 1979) is a former Russian professional football player.

Club career
He played two seasons in the Russian Football National League for FC Ural Yekaterinburg.

References

External links
 

1979 births
People from Nizhny Tagil
Living people
Russian footballers
Association football defenders
FC Ural Yekaterinburg players
FC Tyumen players
FC Sheksna Cherepovets players
FC Uralets Nizhny Tagil players
Sportspeople from Sverdlovsk Oblast